The Calf, at 676 m, is the highest top in the Howgill Fells, an area of high ground in the north-west of the Yorkshire Dales in the county of Cumbria (historically the West Riding of Yorkshire/Westmorland boundary). It can be ascended from the town of Sedbergh to the south, by way of Cautley Spout from the east, or up the long valley of Langdale from the north. The Sedbergh ascent is the most popular, and has the distinction of being on good paths all the way.

The summit commands an extensive panorama, although foreground detail is obscured by the extreme flatness of the plateau. A twenty-mile skyline of the Lakeland peaks can be seen, as well as the Yorkshire Three Peaks and many of the nearer Howgill Fells.

Calders at 674 m is about 1 km SSE of the summit of The Calf.  It is classified as a Hewitt.

Peaks of the Yorkshire Dales
Marilyns of England
Hewitts of England
Nuttalls
Mountains and hills of Cumbria
Sedbergh